O'Rourke is an Irish Gaelic clan based most prominently in what is today County Leitrim. The family were the historic rulers of Breifne and later West Breifne until the 17th century. The O'Rourke Clan Chieftain was at odds with the O'Reilly Chieftain because both clans contested each other for the title Prince of Breifne.

Naming conventions

People
O'Rourke may refer to several people:
 O'Rourke (baseball), baseball player
 Andrew O'Rourke, judge and politician from New York State
 Beto O'Rourke (born 1972), American politician in Texas.
 Brian O'Rourke (1540–1591), hereditary lord of West Breifne in Ireland
 Brian Oge O'Rourke (1568–1604), lord of West Breifne
 Bud O'Rourke (1919–2001), American basketball player
 Colm O'Rourke (born 1957), Irish footballer 
 Danny O'Rourke (born 1983), American soccer player
 Declan O'Rourke, Irish singer 
 Denis O'Rourke (born 1946), New Zealand politician
 Dennis O'Rourke (born 1945), Australian documentary film director
 Derval O'Rourke (born 1981), Irish sprint hurdles athlete
 Edward O'Rourke (1876–1943), Polish Roman Catholic priest, bishop of Riga, first bishop of Danzig (Gdańsk)
 Frank O'Rourke (disambiguation), multiple people
 Hayden Rorke actor
 Heather O'Rourke (1975–1988), American child actress
 Jack O'Rourke (football), semi-pro football player   
 Jet O'Rourke (born 1983), Australian Pop/ Rock singer songwriter
 Jim O'Rourke (baseball player) (1850–1919), American professional baseball player
 Jim O'Rourke (musician) (born 1969), American musician and producer
 John O'Rourke (footballer, born 1945) (born 1945), English footballer
 John O'Rourke (baseball) (1849–1911), American baseball player
 Joseph O'Rourke (disambiguation), multiple people
 Kathy Kirby stage name of Kathleen O'Rourke, pop singer
 Kevin O'Rourke, Irish economist
 Lou Ann O'Rourke, (died 2019), American Bridge player
 Malachy O'Rourke, Irish footballer and manager
 Mary O'Rourke (born 1937), Irish politician
 Míceál O'Rourke, an Irish classical pianist
 Michael O'Rourke (gambler) (1862–1882 alias "Johnny-Behind-the-Deuce"), a professional gambler of the Old West
 Michael James O'Rourke (1878–1957), Canadian recipient of the Victoria Cross
 Mike O'Rourke (baseball) (1868-1934), Major League Baseball pitcher 
 Mike O'Rourke (athlete) (born 1955), New Zealand javelin thrower
 Paddy O'Rourke (disambiguation)
 P. J. O'Rourke (1947–2022), American political satirist, journalist, and writer
 Patrick Henry O'Rourke (1837–1863), Irish-born Civil War colonel
 Peter O'Rourke (footballer) (1874–1956), Scottish footballer and manager
 Ryan O'Rourke (born 1988), American baseball player
 Sean O'Rourke, Irish journalist and broadcaster
 Steve O'Rourke (1940–2003), manager of rock band Pink Floyd
 Tammy O'Rourke (born 1971), child dancer and actress
 Timothy O'Rourke, American college football head coach
 TS O'Rourke (born 1968), Irish author
 Ualgarg O'Rourke, (died 1346), king of West Breifne

See also
 O'Rourke (Livonian family)
 Laing O'Rourke, a construction firm in the UK 
 Walton and O'Rourke, a famous team of cabaret puppeteers
 O'Rorke
 Rourke

References

External links
O'Rourke family pedigree at Library Ireland
The Irish O'Reilly family and their connections to Austria and Russia by Stefan M. Newerkla, with chapter 3.2 on the family O'Rourke in the Russian and Austrian context

Ancient Irish dynasties